The Pursuit to Haritan occurred between 29 September and 26 October 1918 when the XXI Corps and Desert Mounted Corps of the Egyptian Expeditionary Force (EEF) pursued the retreating remnants of the Yildirim Army Group advanced north from Damascus after that city was captured on 1 October during the final weeks of the Sinai and Palestine Campaign of the First World War. The infantry and corps cavalry advanced from Haifa and Acre to capture the Mediterranean ports at Beirut and Tripoli between 29 September and 9 October. These captures enabled the inland pursuit to be supplied when the Desert Mounted Corps' 5th Cavalry Division resumed the pursuit on 5 October. The cavalry division occupied one after the other, Rayak, Homs, Hama. Meanwhile, Prince Feisal's Sherifial Force which advanced on the cavalry division's right flank, attacked and captured Aleppo during the night of 25/26 October after an unsuccessful daytime attack. The next day the 15th (Imperial Service) Cavalry Brigade charged a retreating column and attacked a rearguard during the Charge at Haritan near Haritan which was at first reinforced but subsequently withdrew further north.

Following the victory at the Battle of Megiddo on 25 September the Yildirim Army Group was forced to withdraw towards Damascus. The commander of the Egyptian Expeditionary Force General Edmund Allenby ordered Lieutenant General Henry Chauvel's Desert Mounted Corps to pursue these retreating columns. Followed by the 5th Cavalry Division, the Australian Mounted Division pursuit took them via Kuneitra and the 4th Cavalry Division pursuit took them inland to the Hejaz railway where they joined forces with Prince Feisal's Sherifial Force after their captured Deraa. Several rearguards were attacked and captured at Irbid by the 4th Cavalry Division Jisr Benat Yakub, Kuneitra, Sa'sa', Kaukab, the Barda Gorge by the Australian Mounted Division and Kiswe by the 5th Cavalry Division. After Damascus was captured the remnant Yildirim Army Group were pursued along the road to Homs and attacked by light horsemen at the Charge at Khan Ayash.

While the Yildirim Army Group was retreating back their lines of communication were shortened facilitating supply while Desert Mounted Corps was getting further away from their base and their lines of communication had to be extended. The pursuit north from Damascus began with the advance along the Mediterranean coast by the XXI Corps north from Haifa and Acre to capture the ports at Beirut and Tripoli through which supplies could be transported to support Desert Mounted Corps advance. While the Australian Mounted Division continued to garrison Damascus the 4th and 5th Cavalry Divisions continued the pursuit towards Rayak and Baalbek as the advance along the coast was progressing. From Baalbek the 4th Cavalry Division could not continue due to sickness and remained to garrison the area while the 5th Cavalry Division, was reorganised into two columns and reinforced by a number of armoured cars continued the pursuit with Prince Feisal's Sherifial Force covering their right flank to Homs and Hama. Early in the morning of 26 October the 15th Imperial Service Cavalry Brigade continued the pursuit to Haritan where they charged Ottoman rearguards which proved too strong. By that evening, the 14th Cavalry Brigade had arrived and the strong Ottoman rearguard withdrew as a result. On 27 October the Australian Mounted Division was ordered to advance to Aleppo. They had reached Homs, when the Armistice of Mudros was announced, ending the war in the Sinai and Palestine theatre of the First World War.

Background 

In southern Lebanon lived four varieties of Christians; the Maronite, Greek Uniats, Greek and Syrian Orthodox (Jacobite) lived alongside many Protestants, Druzes and Metawala. In the Southern Bukaa Valley and on the western slope of Mount Hermon, were more Druses, while in the Bukaa, Metawala and Syrian Orthodox Christians lived. In the Northern Lebanon, besides the same sects of Christians as in the south, more Metawala and an exclusive sect of Shiahs, the Ismailiyah lived. North of Damascus many Syrian Christians lived, and to both the north and the south some Metawala. Villages north to the Lake of Homs were Christian and Arab, while the city was mainly Moslem with a Christian minority of mainly Greek Orthodox. To the east of all these peoples, were the nomadic Bedouin Arabs of the Beni Khalid and Nueim tribes, who according to a British Army report came "from the steppe hills and desert east of Homs and Anti-Lebanon", to spend the summer in Bukaa.

Following the comprehensive success of the Battle of Megiddo, Sir Henry Wilson, Chief of the Imperial General Staff (CIGS) at the War Office encouraged Allenby with the idea that the EEF could do anything: "There is much talk here of the usual kind some saying you could go to Petrograd and some saying that all your force should now be transported to France, and some again who would like to see you march east to Baghdad!" He continued: "Your success being so complete, I should like you to consider the possibility of a cavalry raid on Aleppo, to be supported by infantry or not as the situation developed and as opportunities offered." He added that the War Cabinet was prepared to take full responsibility for any unsuccessful outcomes.

However, the difficult problem of supplying even a small force as far north as Aleppo  from base would need to be solved. Before either Damascus or Beirut had been captured, Allenby explained to Wilson that a raid on Aleppo "did not seem feasible unless supported by large-scale military and naval operations at Alexandretta."

Prelude

Yildirim Army Group concentrate at Rayak 

Liman von Sanders had seen the Eighth Army destroyed and its headquarters dissolved and the loss of most of the Yildirim Army Group's artillery.

The surviving 300 German and Ottoman soldiers who had formed the Haifa garrison arrived at Beirut on 26 September and were ordered to continue on to Rayak.

Liman von Sanders transferred his headquarters to Baalbek on 29 September and Mustapha Kemal Pasha, commander of the Seventh Army, arrived at Kiswe with his army's leading troops. He was also ordered to Rayak to take over command of that sector, Jemal Pasha, commander of the Fourth Army also took command of the Tiberias Group defending Damascus while Jevad Pasha and the Eighth Army staff had been sent back to Constantinople. The 146th Regiment was the last formation to leave Damascus on 30 September. After hearing the Barada Gorge was closed von Hammerstein left Damascus by the Homs road, following the III Corps, the 24th Division and the 3rd Cavalry Division to Rayak where even remnants of the 43rd Division of the Second Army which had not been involved in fighting, were "infected with panic."

About 19,000 Ottoman soldiers had retreated northwards by 1 October, no more than 4,000 of whom were equipped and able to fight. "Successive defeats in adverse conditions meant that their morale and physical condition were generally poor, they had no artillery support and transport was virtually non–existent ... they were unlikely to be able to offer much solid resistance to a determined British cavalry force operating north of Damascus."

Only von Oppen's force which had travelled by train to Rayak before the Barda Gorge was closed and the 146th Regiment marching to Homs remained "disciplined formations" by 2 October.

EEF advance from Haifa 
Allenby's plan outlined to Henry Wilson, CIGS at the War Office on 25 September, included an advance to Beirut at the same time as the advance to Damascus:

However, the 7th (Meerut) Division (XXI Corps) with the 102nd Brigade Royal Garrison Artillery and did not arrive at Haifa until 29 September while the XXI Corps Cavalry Regiment which was attached, was at Acre. They were unable to leave until 3 October when the 54th (East Anglian) Division took over garrison duties in the Haifa area.

The 7th (Meerut) Division began their march to Beirut in three columns. The leading column consisted of the Corps Cavalry Regiment, one company of infantry and the 2nd Light Armoured motor Battery. The second column consisted of the 3rd and 4th Companies Sappers and Miners, the 121st Pioneers with the 53rd Sikhs and 2nd Battalion Leicestershire Regiment (28th Brigade). The remainder of the 28th Brigade with the 19th and 28th Brigades of infantry, the 261st, 262nd and 264th Brigades of Royal Field Artillery (RFA) and the 522nd Field Coy, RE completed the 7th (Meerut) Division.

The second column began work to improve this narrow track cut over the cliff face. It took three days to blast the rock and build a surface suitable for wheeled transport.

Meanwhile, the XXI Corps Cavalry Regiment comprising one squadron Duke of Lancashire Yeomanry and two squadrons of 1/1st Hertfordshire Yeomanry were able to advance without waiting for the road works to be completed. They moved quickly along the road to arrive in Tyre also known as Es Sur on 4 October.

During the advance to Tyre they encountered "few if any Turkish troops." Three days supplies were delivered by sea to Tyre, for the three columns to pick up on their way north. By 6 October the leading column had entered Sidon also known as Saida, where more supplies arrived, again by ship.

Occupation of Beirut 

The Ottoman 43rd Division which had arrived early in October had been assigned the defence of Beirut.

The first British Empire forces to arrive at Beirut were an armoured car reconnaissance from Rayak or Zahle by the 5th Cavalry Division on 7 October. They found Ottoman forces had already evacuated the city and an Arab government under Shukri Pasha Ayubi had been installed. A French destroyer and five French vessels were also in Beirut harbour.

The XXI Corps Cavalry Regiment with attached infantry company and the 2nd Light Armoured Motor Battery arrived at Beirut on 8 October. The city was occupied without opposition when 600 prisoners were captured. The remainder of the infantry division and artillery followed when the road enabled the movement of wheeled vehicles. Private Norman F. Rothon, a mule driver with the 13th Mountain Howitzer Battery, 8th Brigade RGA, 7th (Meerut) Division, arrived at Beirut on the evening of 9 October. He and his unit had marched  since 19 September;  of that total were marched between 8 and 9 October. Rothon wrote in his diary, "if I was asked how I felt when we arrived I should say like a cripple and fairly doubled up and I hope I shall never experience another march like it the men tramping along with hollow cheeks and staring eyes, nothing to eat but the awful Bouilli & Biscuits and lots of the men go without as their stomachs cannot stand the awful repetition (we have had 3 weeks of it). My inside yearns for some ordinary food & vegetables."

Lieutenant General E. S. Bulfin, commander of the XXI Corps, established his headquarters in the city's main hotel, to oversea devolution of the city's administration to the French following the terms of the Sykes–Picot Agreement. He appointed Colonel de Piépape, commander of the infantry Détachment Français de Palestine et de Syrie, military governor at Beirut. He also appointed French military governors to Sidon and Tyre. When detachments of French troops arrived from Haifa by sea to garrison the three towns, they found some unrest caused by disappointed Arab Sherifial representatives. The infantry Détachment Français de Palestine et de Syrie arrived at Beirut on 20 October, and the cavalry Regiment Mixte de Marche de Palestine et Syrie, detached from the 5th Light Horse Brigade, arrived on 24 October. The 54th (East Anglian) Division arrived at Beirut on 31 October 1918.

On 11 October Allenby reported to the War Office:

Chauvel recalled in 1929:

Occupation of Tripoli 
On 9 October Allenby issued orders for the speedy occupation of Tripoli by the 7th (Meerut) Division. The town and the port of El Mina were strategically important because supplies could be unloading at the port and quickly transported inland to Homs on the main road to Aleppo. The capture of Tripoli would vastly improve the lines of communication supporting the pursuit.

Tripoli was occupied unopposed on 13 October by the 7th (Meerut) Division led once again by the XXI Corps Cavalry Regiment and the 2nd Light Armoured Motor Battery following Bulfin's orders for the continuation of the coastal advance northwards. The leading column was followed by the 19th Infantry Brigade Group commanded by Brigadier General W. S. Leslie which arrived on 18 October. The remainder of the 7th (Meerut) Division arrived not long after. Rothon arrived in Tripoli on 18 October, after a  march over mountain passes and sand. "Felt absolutely done up when we got here and at times felt like lying down and giving in as I feel as if my very life blood is being drawn from me in these long marches, in addition to which we are only at half strength which means double work for us all." He was hospitalised in Tripoli shortly after and was still there at the end of the month.

The 5th Cavalry Division was ordered on 9 October to advance to Homs, where they could be supplied overland, along the fairly good road from Tripoli, as a direct result of that town, with its small port of jetties "suitable for landing stores in fine weather", being occupied. On 22 October a casualty clearing station was landed at Tripoli to evacuate 5th Cavalry Division sick and wounded.

Pursuit from Damascus

Yildirim Army Group withdraw from Rayak 
After an RAF attack on Rayak, Liman von Sanders withdrew the Rayak force on 2 October sending most of his troops including Colonel von Oppen's Asia Corps under the command of Mustapha Kemal to Aleppo, to prepare a defence. This force retreated to Homs via Ba'albek on their way to Aleppo; the first place offering the possibility of a strong defence, while the remnant Fourth Army prepared a rearguard defence of Homs.

The Seventh Army's III Corps' 1st and 11th Divisions and XX Corps and the 48th Infantry Division, were still intact and conducting a fighting retreat by 6 October. The 1st and 11th Divisions had been reorganised into the new XX Corps, which included one complete Turkish regiment.

4th and 5th Cavalry Divisions' pursuit 

The country north from Damascus, with its grand mountains and fertile valley and slopes, was described as being more beautiful than that to the south of the city. The Nahr el Litani or Leontes river flowing south between the parallel ranges of the Lebanon and the Anti-Lebanon enters the sea between Tyre and Sidon. Along the valley cattle, sheep and goats grazed and barley and wheat were grown with oats in the north. The only breaks in the north-south Lebanon and Anti-Lebanon mountain ranges occur from Damascus to Beirut and from Homs to Tripoli.

On 5 October the advance north was resumed although supply would be difficult. Allenby anticipated capturing the ports of Beirut and Tripoli, which would improve supplying rations to Desert Mounted Corps. "Nevertheless his decision [to continue the pursuit] was born of rare ambition and resolution." It would be a "bold move" as the British Empire troops would be well beyond range of support from the rest of the EEF.

Allenby briefed Chauvel on his Aleppo campaign plans at Chauvel's new headquarters in a former Yilderim Army Group building in the south–western suburbs during his day-trip to Damascus on 3 October.

The Sherwood Rangers regiment which had been on the lines of communication at Kuneitra rejoined the 14th Cavalry Brigade, 5th Cavalry Division. The 12th Light Armoured Motor Battery and the 7th Light Car Patrol also joined the divisions.

From Khan Meizelun the 4th Cavalry Division moved to Zebdani on the railway between Damascus and Rayak while the 5th Cavalry Division moved towards Rayak by the main road through Shtora. On the march towards Shtora, "A violent storm, lasting several hours, burst as soon as bivouac was reached and lasted the greater part of the night. This did not improve matters as regards the malaria outbreak, which was by then almost at its height."

Occupation of Rayak 
Rayak was reported to be occupied by about 1,000 Ottoman and German soldiers. During the night of 5/6 October, a report was received that the Ottomans had withdrawn from Rayak.

The 5th Cavalry Division and 14th Brigade arrived in Rayak on 6 October to find considerable destruction caused by an RAF air-raid on 2 October and captured some prisoners, railway rolling stock and military equipment. Here the remains of 32 German aircraft were found, "including some of the latest type, [which] had been either abandoned or burnt by the enemy." Military equipment, engineers' stores, several locomotives and rail trucks were captured at Rayak. The 14th Cavalry brigade also captured 177 prisoners and some guns when they occupied Zahle a few miles north of Rayak, also without opposition.

Beirut reconnaissance 
On 7 October armoured cars attached to the 5th Cavalry Division made a reconnaissance to Beirut, without opposition being encountered. They arrived about noon to find Ottoman forces had withdrawn from the city.

Occupation of Baalbek 
On 9 October Allenby ordered the continuation of their advance to Homs following the railway.

Baalbek was occupied unopposed on 10 October by a light armoured car reconnaissance.

End of 4th Cavalry Division's campaign 

The EEF was still in vastly superior strength to the enemy in the area when Allenby made the initial decision to push the 4th and 5th Cavalry Divisions as far as the Rayak to Beirut line. Desert Mounted Corps numbers, however dropped dramatically each day as increasing numbers of men became ill, weakening the corps' effectiveness.

On 14 October, the 4th Cavalry Division moved to Shtora , in the Rayak Valley. Maunsell described the scene in the following passage: "This was magnificent, very fertile, and with many fruit trees. It was also a great grain–growing area. There were many wine factories at Shtora. The slopes of the Lebanon were covered with vineyards. The Anti–Lebanon, that is the range on the Damascus side of the valley, are pretty bare and resemble the Indian Frontier. At Shtora the surplus horses were left behind. They far outnumbered the men and it was with the utmost difficulty that they could be moved about. One man was leading five horses in Jacob's Horse, and the British units had to drive animals like herds."

On 16 October, the 4th Cavalry Division arrived at Baalbek on the plain between the Lebanon and Anti-Lebanon mountains, where the days were hot and the nights cool. Here was found a good supply of water and tibben (bhoosa), but the division was "immobilised by losses through sickness" when a particularly virulent epidemic of malaria (malignant tertian) and influenza suddenly broke out. The division evacuated almost 80 per cent of the troopers; 3,600 were sick of whom 400 died. Allenby and Chauvel spent some days visiting the troopers while the division was at Ba'albek with a brigade at Lebwe. According to Maunsell, "the Middlesex Yeomanry were down to twenty-six officers and men, while Jacob's Horse had an average of twenty-five men per squadron only. The difficulty of looking after the horses can be imagined and we had to have numbers of Turk prisoners to help."

The 5th Cavalry Division began their advance to Aleppo on 20 October, when the 4th Cavalry Division, reduced to 1,200 through the effects of sickness, was to move north to garrison Homs. But Falls notes that it was unable to do so "still less to support the 5th in case of need at Aleppo." Thus, Maunsell writes, "the Great War, so far as the 4th Cavalry Division was concerned, was ended."

Reorganisation of 5th Cavalry Division 
At Baalbek, General MacAndrew reorganised his 5th Cavalry Division into two columns; the lead unit Column "A" consisted of the divisional headquarters, 24 cars in three batteries of armoured cars, and three light car patrols armed with machine guns, supported by the 15th Imperial Service Cavalry Brigade (less the Hyderabad Lancers on the line of communications). The country was "fairly flat" with a good surface for the cars to negotiate and with their heavy machine–gun fire they were a strong raiding force.

5th Cavalry Division and Sherifial Force pursuit 
The 5th Cavalry Division had not been so badly affected by sickness and was able to continue the pursuit as it had garrisoned Afulah and Nazareth well away from the mosquito infested areas along the Jordan River. Nor were they involved in the fighting at Jisr Benat Yakub, when they were in reserve to the Australian Mounted Division. Allenby now ordered the 5th Cavalry Division to advance to Homs while the 4th Cavalry Division, which barely had enough men to carry out normal camp duties, remained to garrison the Zahle-Rayak-Baalbek area.

The 5th Cavalry Division was organised into two columns for the pursuit to Homs. The leading column consisted of the 13th Cavalry Brigade commanded by Brigadier General G. A. Weir (who succeeded P. J. V. Kelly), "B" Battery HAC and armoured cars, with the remainder of the division in the rear column, a day's march behind. Chauvel ordered them to advance up the Nahr el Litani valley between the Lebanon and Anti Lebanon mountain ranges, while 1,500 regular Hejaz soldiers commanded by Nuri Bey part of the Sharif of Mecca's Sherifial Force commanded by Prince Feisal, covered the cavalry's right flank by advancing north along the main Damascus to Homs road. The leading column of the cavalry reached Lebwe on 13 October, El Qa'a on 14 October and El Quseir on 15 October a total of  passing through the fertile plain of the Nahr el Litani valley where bread, meat and grain was easily requisitioned at each place.

Occupation of Homs 

The Fourth Army commanded by Djemal Kuchuk had been ordered to form a rearguard to hold Homs for as long as possible, while von Oppen's Asia Corps (formerly part of the Eighth Army) continued on to Aleppo where Mustapha Kemal and the remnants of his Seventh Army were preparing defenses. On 16 October the headquarters of the Fourth Army at Homs was encircled and captured although it had been reported for some days that Homs had been evacuated.

The armoured cars, 13th Cavalry Brigade and Nuri Bey's Sherifial Force arrived in the city of 70,000 with its crusader castle, on 16 October. On 18 October Allenby ordered Chauvel to prepare to push the 5th Cavalry Division north on 20 October and to capture Aleppo by 26 October. Allenby had ordered the 2nd Light Car Patrol and the 2nd Light Armoured Motor Battery which had been attached to the 7th (Meerut) Division (XXI Corps) to join the 5th Cavalry Division at Homs.

The 5th Cavalry Division's fighting strength of 2,500 included the strongest column of armoured cars so far employed in the theatre. These included the 2nd, 11th and 12th Light Armoured Motor Batteries and the 1st (Australian), 2nd and 7th Light Car Patrols.

The 4th Cavalry Division was to advance to Homs in support. When Chauvel reported the 4th Cavalry Division unable to move, Allenby decided not to risk the 5th Cavalry Division against Aleppo . He considered the city too remote an objective, with the increasing threat of encountering effective rearguards the further north they rode, and he ordered the pursuit to stop at Hama.

Occupation of Hama 

The remaining soldiers in the 48th Infantry Regiment which had been part of the 16th Division, Asia Corps (formerly Eighth Army) at the beginning of the Battle of Megiddo on 19 September, set up a rearguard at Hama. However, the rearguard was eventually forced to withdraw on 19 October as Desert Mounted Corps approached.

Allenby had ordered the 5th Cavalry Division to continue the pursuit from Homs 120 miles (190 km) north to Aleppo on 20 October, with the 4th Cavalry Division advancing to occupy Homs, in support. However, the 4th Cavalry Division had been reduced by sickness to a strength of 1,200 by 20 October and was unable to move. The pursuit was to be reinforced by Feisal, who "promised to despatch 1,500 troops from Homs under Sherif Nasir, and hoped to raise some thousands more of local Arabs on his march." This was in addition to the 1,500 regular Hejaz Sherifial Force commanded by Nuri Bey already guarding the right flank of the cavalry division.

However, when Allenby heard the 4th Cavalry Division could not support the pursuit, he decided not to risk a division against remote objectives, which could become vulnerable to capture the further north they rode, and ordered the pursuit stopped. The 5th Cavalry Division was to remain to occupy Hama a city of 60,000 which had already been captured before 20 October by Feisal's Sherifial Force.

The order to stop the pursuit reached Macandrew, commanding the 5th Cavalry Division, after his first day's march from Homs towards Hama, in the evening of 20 October. His reply reads:

Chauvel asked for clarification from Allenby after receiving Macandrew's message. Allenby changed his mind, approving the advance to Aleppo on 21 October 1918.

The 15th Imperial Service Cavalry Brigade (5th Cavalry Division) with the 5th Field Squadron R. E. arrived to repair the span of the bridge on 19 October. Repairs were complete by 06:00 on 21 October and by that afternoon the 5th Cavalry Division's headquarters, the 15th Imperial Service Cavalry Brigade (less the Hyderabad Lancers on the lines of communication south of Damascus) and the armoured cars arrived at Hama.

Pursuit continues towards Aleppo 

Here "they sighted some enemy armoured cars and armed motor lorries." A  running battle was fought between the mobile forces of one German armoured car and six lorries and the 5th Cavalry Division's armoured cars. The "German armoured car, two armed lorries, and thirty–seven prisoners" were subsequently captured.

The 15th (Imperial Service) Cavalry Brigade reached Khan Shaikhun late in the afternoon of 22 October.

Air support 

They conducted aerial reconnaissances and bombing raids, bombing the German aerodromes at Rayak on 2 October where 32 German machines, were seen three hours later by two Bristol Fighters to have been abandoned or burnt. On 9 October five Bristol Fighters attacked with bombs and machine–guns, troops getting on trains at Homs railway station. A similar attack took place on 16 October when trains at Hama station were the target. On 19 October the first German aircraft seen in the air since the aerial fighting over Deraa, a D.F.W. two–seater was forced to land. The aircraft was destroyed on the ground by firing a Very light into the aircraft after the German pilot and observer had moved to safety. The Mouslimie railway junction of the Baghdad and Palestine railways north of Aleppo, was bombed on 23 October and at noon five Australian aircraft bombed the city and Aleppo railway station.

Sherifial Force captures Aleppo 

Mustapha Kemal, commander of the Seventh Army, and Nihat Pasha, commander of the Second Army, organised the 6,000 to 7,000 soldiers to defend Aleppo.

When the armoured cars attached to the 5th Cavalry Division reached the southern defences on 23 October, the commander of the 7th Light Car Patrol under a flag of truce demanded Mustapha Kemal surrender Aleppo, which was rejected.

While an attack was planned by the commander of the armoured cars to take place on 26 October, Sherifial forces commanded by Colonel Nuri Bey and Sherif Nasir following an unsuccessful daylight attack on 25 October proceed that night with a successful attack. They captured Aleppo after fierce hand-to-hand fighting through the city streets which lasted most of the night.

Advance to Haritan 

After the capture of Aleppo, the remnant of the Seventh Army commanded by Mustapha Kemal which had withdrawn from Damascus, was now deployed to the north and northwest of that city. The Second Army of about 16,000 armed troops commanded by Nihad Pasha was deployed to the west in Cilicia and the Sixth Army with another 16,000 armed troops commanded by Ali Ihsan which had been withdrawn from Mesopotamia was to the northeast around Nusaybin. These Ottoman forces grossly outnumbered the 15th Imperial Service Brigade.

However, on 26 October the Jodhpore and Mysore lancer regiments of the 15th Imperial Service Cavalry Brigade without artillery support, but with a subsection of the 15th Machine Gun Squadron, as part of Macandrew's preempted attack on Aleppo, advanced over a ridge to the west of the city to cut the Alexandretta road. They continued their advance north west of Aleppo towards Haritan.

A strong Ottoman column was seen retiring north of Aleppo along the Alexandretta road by the 15th Imperial Service Cavalry Brigade. The Mysore Lancers advanced at the charge; three squadrons in line of squadron columns, the fourth squadron in support to capture a rearguard position held by 150 Ottoman soldiers armed with rifles and artillery. About 50 survived and 20 were taken prisoner. The Jodhpur and Mysore Lancers made a second unsuccessful charge after the position had been strong reinforced by as many as 2,000 soldiers commanded by Mustapha Kemal. Fighting continued throughout the day until at about 23:00 when the 14th Cavalry Brigade (5th Cavalry Division) arrived and the Ottoman force withdrew ending the last engagement of the war in the Middle East.

During the 38 days between 19 September and 28 October, the 15th Imperial Service Cavalry Brigade had ridden  and the 5th Cavalry Division had fought six actions, with the loss of 21 percent of its horses.

5th Cavalry Division operations 

The next day armoured cars reported the rearguard had withdrawn  to Deir el Jemal. This line was defended by a force six times greater than Macandrew's, made up of the newly created XX Corps' 1st and 11th Divisions with between 2,000 and 3,000 soldiers sourced from drafts and a reinforcement of one complete regiment, and the 24th and 43rd Divisions commanded by Mustapha Kemal Pasha who had his headquarters at Katma. The 5th Cavalry Division kept this line under observation while waiting to be reinforced by the Australian Mounted Division.

Australian Mounted Division advance 
The Australian Mounted Division was ordered to advance to reinforce Macandrew's 5th Cavalry Division at Aleppo. The division marched out of Damascus on 27 October riding through Duma and Nebk east of the Anti-Lebanon range to reach Homs on 1 November; where they learned the war against the Ottoman Empire was finished.

Four regiments of the division, along with the 4th Light Horse Brigade headquarters had been deployed at Kuneitra on the lines of communication since 28 September. The 3rd Light Horse Brigade had been deployed in the Damascus area along with the 4th and 12th Light Horse Regiments on guard duty. The 10th Light Horse Regiment had been deployed to Kaukab and placed in charge of the prisoner of war camp there until 30 October when they too moved out for Homs.

The advance of the Australian Mounted Division began on 25 October when the garrison at Kuneitra moved out leaving the Hyderabad Lancers to continue guard duties. They joined the division at El Mezze at 15:30 on 26 October when the 4th and 12th Light Horse Regiments rejoined their 4th Light Horse Brigade. The ration strength of the division on 26 October was 4,295 soldiers. Orders to advance to Homs were received on 27 October and they left Damascus the next day.

After reveille at 05:00 the 12th Light Horse Regiment marched out at 10:30 on 28 October to join the 4th Light Horse Brigade at 12:00 before marching through Damascus to Khan Kussier where they arrived at 17:00. After reveille at 05:30 and watering at 07:00 on 29 October, the march resumed at 09:00 arriving at Kuteife at 13:15 to bivouac. After reveille at 04:00 the march was resumed at 06:00 on 30 October, arriving at Kustul at 12:00 where they halted 1 hour and 15 minutes before proceeding on to Nebk where they arrived at 15:55 and bivouacked for the night. At 07:45 on 31 October the march was resumed, arriving at Kara at 11:30 where they lunched and the horses were watered before resuming the march at 13:15 to arrive at Hassie at 19:00 to bivouac for five hours. At 23:00 the march was resumed to Homs where they arrived at 08:30 on 1 November 1918 "all weary & tired." The 12th Light Horse Regiment suffered 58 casualties during this advance. The 4th Light Horse Brigade evacuated 60 soldiers to the 4th Light Horse Field Ambulance during the march from Damascus to Homs.

The armistice was concluded on 31 October. Wavell noted that this was "three years almost to a day since Turkey had entered the war," while Jones highlighted the fact that it was "a year to the day after the charge at Beersheba." As there was no water in the area the Australian Mounted Division continued their march to arrive at Homs at 08:00 on 1 November having ridden  during their last advance.

On 3 November, the Armistice with the Austria-Hungarian Empire was concluded and the Australian Mounted Division (less the 5th Light Horse Brigade which remained at Homs) began their last ride. The rode from Homs to Tripoli on the Mediterranean coast, where they remained until being shipped back to Egypt at the end of February 1919. The 4th Light Horse Brigade was still at Homs the next day when Chauvel visited their camp and inspected the men and horses.

Aftermath 
General Wavell's figures of 75,000 prisoners and 360 guns captured by the EEF between 18 September and 31 October were also quoted in the Turkish official history of the campaign. In 38 days of fighting  of Ottoman Empire territory had been occupied by the EEF along with more than 100,000 prisoners and unknown casualties.

According to Falls, "the thoroughness of the Turkish defeat is almost without a parallel in modern military history." This successful campaign resulted from "careful planning and bold execution. Combined and coordinated use of artillery, infantry, the RAF and cavalry were all essential aspects of the plan. However, what transformed the battle from a successful penetration of the 8th Turkish army's front into a great battle of annihilation that ended in the total destruction of three armies was the adroit and bold use of cavalry ... by two cavalry generals, Allenby and Chauvel."

The EEF had suffered the loss of 782 killed and 4,179 wounded soldiers. Between 19 September and 31 October the casualties totalled 5,666; Desert Mounted Corps suffering 650 of these. The total battle casualties of the Suez Canal, the Sinai, the Levant and the Jordan campaigns; from January 1915 totalled 51,451.

Tuesday 16 December was selected as a day of thanksgiving for victory throughout the EEF when religious services were held during the morning with games and sports organised for the afternoon.

Yildirim Army Group 

Liman von Sanders was recalled to Constantinople on 30 October when Ahmet Izzet Pasa, the Ottoman Minister of War appointed Mustafa Kemal Pasa to command the Yildirim Army Group headquartered at Adana. Here Mustafa Kemal began to plan the defense of Anatolia with the Ottoman Army still "in the field."

The force Mustapha Kemal commanded "would have met the fate of the rest within a few weeks, when a frontal attack would have been combined with a landing at Alexandretta." It was saved by the Armistice.

Armistice 
These enormous losses and the threat from the EEF were not alone responsible for the armistice; General Milne's army was advancing towards Thrace and Constantinople to threaten Anatolia. In addition, Erickson argues that "the Salonika beachhead created a strategic crisis for which there was no answer."

The Ottoman Empire's highest-ranking British prisoner, Major General CharlesTownshend, was sent to Lesbos where he announced the Ottoman Empire's "intention to seek an armistice." Negotiations took place at Mudros and, as Erickson recounts, the "armistice was signed on the deck of the battleship Agamemnon on October 30, 1918."

Writing in 1920, Dinning described how the news was received amongst the troops around Baalbek: "We parked outside the lights of Baalbek ... The news of the Turkish Armistice, beginning this midday, had just come through. I think the dinner was a sort of thanksgiving meal. There was most excellent good soup, a roast pigeon each, some sweets and savoury, and flagon after flagon of cocoa – good for this nipping and eager air, for this is the opening of winter. The alternative to this had been bully beef and jam.

Chauvel was in Aleppo when the armistice with the Ottoman Empire was announced. Eleven days later the war in Europe also came to an end.

Implementation of the armistice 

There are other views of the armistice and its implementation:

The terms of the Armistice required the Ottoman Empire:

Chauvel, from his GHQ at Homs recommended the removal of Mustapha Kemal who subsequently lost command of the Seventh Army.

No. 1 Squadron AFC 
After the armistice No. 1 Squadron AFC moved back to Ramleh in December 1918 and Kantara in February 1919.

On 19 February Allenby addressed the squadron:

Occupation 

According to Bruce, the "success of the Allied campaign in the Middle East between 1914 and 1918, which helped to bring down an empire, was never matched by its political outcomes." On 23 October, Allenby reported to the War Office that he had appointed Major General Sir A. W. Money chief British administrator of Palestine, the Occupied Enemy Territory South, Colonel de Piépape to administer the future French Zone Occupied Enemy Territory North and General Ali Pasha el Rikabi to administer the Occupied Enemy Territory East. Northforce commanded by Major General Barrow and consisting of the 4th and 5th Cavalry Divisions and two divisions of infantry took over administration of the captured territory. They garrisoned places up the coast to Smyrna, and administered the Baghdad Railway from Constantinople to the railhead east of Nisibin in Mesopotamia until the administration of northern Syria was given to the French.

Allenby was informed on 27 October that he was to be the sole intermediary on political and administrative questions to do with the Arab Government.

Wingate wrote to Allenby on 2 November:

The objectives of peace in the region were declared on 7 November 1918. Falls writes, "the goal aimed at by France and Great Britain in their conduct in the East of a war unchained by German ambition is the complete and definite freedom of the peoples so long oppressed by the Turks, and the establishment of national governments and administrations deriving their authority from the initiative and free choice of the native population."

At Versailles, however, France demanded the enforcement of the Sykes-Picot Agreement and the Arab zone was divided in two; the southern portion became the Transjordan with French Syria in the north. According to Bruce, "in Palestine it became clear that the price of a permanent imperial presence was likely to be high, as violence flared soon after the end of the war."

Anti-British and anti-Armenian demonstrations led Allenby to order Chauvel to occupy the towns of Marash, Urfa, Killis and Aintab and dismiss the Ottoman commander of the Sixth Army, Ali Ihsan. To carry out these orders required Desert Mounted Corps to move to Aleppo and be reinforced by an infantry brigade, but there was some delay in the remainder of the 4th and 5th Cavalry Divisions moving north and Allenby "went to Constantinople by battleship, interviewed the Turkish ministers for Foreign Affairs and the Army and demanded the acceptance of his conditions and the removal of Ali Ihsan without discussion ... his terms were accepted."

In the aftermath, conflict in the region continued. Bruce notes that "the conflicting claims of Jews and Arabs eventually led to the development of open warfare between them in 1937 and was to lead to the ending of the British mandate in 1948. The territorial claims of the two groups still remain unreconciled and their relationship continues to be characterized by sporadic violence and discord."

Notes

Citations

References 

 
 
 
 
 
 
 
 
 
 
 
 
 
 
 
 
 
 
 
 
 
 
 
 
 
 
 
 
 

Conflicts in 1918
1918 in Ottoman Syria
1918 in Mandatory Syria
Battles of the Sinai and Palestine Campaign
Battles of World War I involving Australia
Battles of World War I involving New Zealand
Battles of World War I involving the United Kingdom
Battles of World War I involving British India
Battles of World War I involving France
Battles of World War I involving the Ottoman Empire
Battles of World War I involving Germany
Middle Eastern theatre of World War I
October 1918 events
Battles of Mustafa Kemal Atatürk